Hesham Abdul Wahab (born 14 October 1990) is an Indian music director, music producer, singer and audio engineer. Best known for his compositions for the soundtrack of the 2022 Malayalam film Hridayam and the music album Qadham Badha ( produced by British singer-songwriter Sami Yusuf. Wahab is the recipient of 2021 Kerala State Film Award for Best Music Director for the soundtrack of the film Hridayam.

Early life
Sayyed Hesham Abdul Wahab was born in Riyadh, the capital city of Saudi Arabia. Born in a family of musicians, he took interest in music at a very young age and got professional training in Carnatic and Hindustani classical music. He started singing at an early age of 8 and was introduced to Piano when he was 11. Hesham married Ayshath Safa on 22 January 2018. After completing schooling from International Indian School in Riyadh, he went on to complete a diploma in Audio Engineering and a Bachelor of Arts degree in Audio Production from SAE Institute with top honor's.

Career

Early career 

Hesham left Saudi Arabia to go to India in 2007 to be part of the music reality show Idea Star Singer which paved the way for his foray into playback singing and later composing.

Recording career
Hesham's first recording project was in 2013 with his first single Meri Dua produced by Offline Creations. He got his first major break when Andante Records signed him for their record label. His first album Qadam Badha(Step Forward), an amalgamation of Sufi music and World Music produced by eminent Iran born British singer-songwriter Sami Yusuf was released in 2015.

He forayed into Malayalam film industry as a music director that same year with the film Salt Mango Tree. His debut as a music composer for the Bollywood film Mera India is set to release in 2019. He has also worked with several noted composers and lent his voice to many Indian films. In 2018, one of his songs – Jaana meri janaa  from the film Cappuccino fetched Vineeth Sreenivasan his second SIIMA award for the Best Playback Singer in Malayalam.

In 2018, He founded LIVE with MUSIC, an independent music academy where he takes classes on sound production. Hesham arranged and mixed filmmaker Alphonse Puthren's debut composition 'Kathakal Chollidaam' which was released as a music video featuring several Malayalam film actors and their children. He composed the soundtrack of Vineeth Sreenivasan's film Hridayam, which consists of 15 songs.

Discography

Films

Albums
Qadam Badha (2015)

Music videos
Meri Dua (2013)
Mothirakkallu (2019)
Await (2020)
Yatra (2020)
Mounam (2021)
Tribute to World Cup Football (2022)

Playback singer
Note: All songs are in Malayalam, unless noted

Awards and nominations
 2015 – Best Music Director – Kairali Cultural Forum Abu Dhabi – Short Film Festival – Oru Vappichi Katha
 2015 – Best Upcoming Music Composer of the Year – Mirchi Music Awards South – Salt Mango Tree
 2016 – Best Singer – Ramu Kariat Award – "Kattummel" (Salt Mango Tree)
2021 – Kerala State Film Award for Best Music Director – Hridayam
2021 – Kerala Film Critics Association Award for Best Music Director – Hridayam
2022 – Best Song – Mazhavil Music Awards – "Darshana" (Hridayam)

References

External links
 
 Facebook

1990 births
Living people
20th-century Indian composers
21st-century composers
Malayalam playback singers
Indian film score composers
Indian male playback singers
Film musicians from Kerala
Indian Muslims
People from Alappuzha district
Indian male film score composers
20th-century Indian male singers
20th-century Indian singers
21st-century Indian male singers
21st-century Indian singers